Kharagpur Atulmoni Polytechnic High School,  is one of the oldest school located in Kharagpur, Paschim Medinipur, West Bengal, India. This school was established in 1938. It is a co-ed Higher Secondary School.

The school follows the course curricula of West Bengal Board of Secondary Education (WBBSE) and West Bengal Council of Higher Secondary Education (WBCHSE) for Standard 10th and 12th Board examinations respectively.

References
 

High schools and secondary schools in West Bengal
Schools in Paschim Medinipur district
Educational institutions established in 1938
1938 establishments in India